Tyson Asi Alualu (born May 12, 1987) is an American football nose tackle for the Pittsburgh Steelers of the National Football League (NFL). He was drafted by the Jacksonville Jaguars in the first round of the 2010 NFL Draft. He played college football at California.

Early years
A native of Honolulu, Hawaii, Alualu attended and graduated from Saint Louis School in Hawaii in 2005.  He was selected to the all-state team twice by the Honolulu Star Bulletin.  He was ranked as the No. 2 player in Hawaii and the No. 24 defensive tackle in America by Rivals.com for 2005. He recorded 7 sacks and 59 tackles in high school.  During his senior year, he was named the ILH Player of the Year by the Honolulu Advertiser.

College career
Alualu played in all 13 games of his first season, then started all thirteen games of his next three consecutive seasons. He earned second-team All-Pac-10 honors in as a junior 2008 and first-team All-Pac-10 honors as a senior in 2009. Following his senior season, Alualu represented Cal at the 2010 Senior Bowl, where he finished the game with a sack, a fumble forced, and a fumble recovered.

Professional career
After the 2009 season, Alualu was ranked at the 12th best defensive line prospect (42nd overall) in the 2010 NFL Draft by Sports Illustrated. Coming out of California in 2010, Alualu was projected to be a first or second round pick. He received an invitation to the NFL combine and completed all of the required combine and positional drills. On March 10, 2010, he participated at California's pro day and opted to attempt the bench press (24),and short shuttle (4.28), achieving better numbers in both. Alualu was ranked the fourth best defensive end by NFLDraftScout.com.

Jacksonville Jaguars
The Jacksonville Jaguars selected Alualu in the first round (10th overall) of the 2010 NFL Draft. The move was widely regarded as the biggest surprise of the draft by analysts and, according to Mel Kiper Jr., was "a risky move for taking him this high".

2010
On August 2, 2010, Alualu signed a five-year deal with the Jaguars. The contract includes $17.5 million guaranteed and a total value of roughly $28 million.

Alualu started his rookie season as the starting defensive tackle, alongside Terrance Knighton. He started the Jacksonville Jaguars' season-opening 24-17 victory over the Denver Broncos and finished with three solo tackles and sacked Kyle Orton for the first of his career. In Week 6, he made a season-high five combined tackles in a 3-30 loss to the Tennessee Titans. Over the course of the season Alualu started all 16 games, recording a total of 38 combined tackles (29 solo) and 3.5 sacks. Following his rookie year, he was named to All-Rookie teams by National Football Post, Pro Football Weekly, and The Sporting News.

2011
On September 18, 2011, he recorded a season-high four solo tackles during a 32-3 loss to the New York Jets. On October 16, 2011, Alualu made three solo tackles and made his first sack of the season on Ben Roethlisberger, as the Jacksonville Jaguars were defeated 17-13 by the Pittsburgh Steelers. He started all 16 games with 40 combined tackles (21 solo), 2.5 sacks, a pass defended, and a fumble recovery returned for seven yards.

2012
Alualu was named the starting defensive tackle by new head coach Mike Mularkey. In the season-opener against the Minnesota Vikings, he collected four combined tackles and sacked Christian Ponder in a 26-23 overtime loss. During a Week 10 loss to the Indianapolis Colts, Alualu recorded five solo tackles and sacked Andrew Luck.

He started all 16 games in 2012 and finished with a career-high 45 combined tackles (34 solo), 3.5 sacks, 1 pass defended, and 1 fumble recovery. The Jacksonville Jaguars finished 2-14 in his only season under head coach Mike Mularkey.

2013

On January 17, 2013, the Jaguars hired Gus Bradley as their head coach, marking Alualu's third head coach entering his fourth season. During organized team activities in May, new head coach Gus Bradley announced that Alualu would move to defensive end. He competed with Jason Babin, Andre Branch, and Jeremy Mincey for the starting defensive end job. Gus Bradley named him the starting defensive end, along with Jason Babin, to begin the  season.

On September 29, 2013, Alualu made a tackle and earned his first full sack of the season on Indianapolis Colts' quarterback Andrew Luck during a 37-3 loss. In Week 7, he collected a season-high six solo tackles in a 24-6 loss to the San Diego Chargers. He finished the season with 42 combined tackles (33 solo tackles) and 1.5 sacks. In head coach Gus Bradley's first season the Jaguars finished 4-12.

2014
He competed with Red Bryant, Chris Clemons, and Andre Branch for a starting defensive end spot. He was named the backup defensive end to Chris Clemons and Red Bryant to begin the regular season.

In a Week 2 loss to the Washington Redskins, Alualu recorded a season-high seven combined tackles. On November 30, 2014, he made one tackle and sacked New York Giants' quarterback Eli Manning for the first of the season. He finished the season with 30 combined tackles (13 solo) and two sacks in 16 games and zero starts.

2015
On March 7, 2015, the Jacksonville Jaguars re-signed Alualu to a two-year, $6 million contract. He participated in training camp and competed for the starting defensive end job with Chris Clemons, Jared Odrick, Ryan Davis, Andre Branch, and Chris Smith. He was named the starting defensive end with Chris Clemons to begin .

In a Week 5 loss to the Tampa Bay Buccaneers, Alualu collected a season-high four combined tackles. On October 12, 2015, he recorded a tackle and sacked Tennessee Titans' quarterback Charlie Whitehurst during a 16-14 loss. During the 2015 season, he played all 16 games starting 14 of them, making 26 tackles (18 solo), two sacks, two passes defended, and a fumble recovery.

2016
Alualu competed with Jared Odrick, Yannick Ngakoue, Chris Smith, and Sen'Derrick Marks for the starting defensive end job. He was named the backup to Jared Odrick and rookie Dante Fowler for the start of the season.

He was a healthy scratch for the first two games of the season. On September 25, 2016, he earned his first start of the season, playing in place of Jared Odrick who suffered a triceps injury the week prior. He made three combined tackles during the 19-17 loss to the Baltimore Ravens. The next week, Alualu earned two combined tackles and sacked Andrew Luck, for his first of the season, as the Jaguars defeated the Indianapolis Colts 30-27. He finished with a total of 37 combined tackles (29 solo) and 2.5 sacks in 14 games and ten starts.

Alualu was not resigned and became an unrestricted free agent at the completion of the 2016 season.

Pittsburgh Steelers
On March 21, 2017, the Pittsburgh Steelers signed Alualu to a two-year, $6 million contract that includes $1.75 million guaranteed and a signing bonus of $1.25 million.

2017
He competed with Leterrius Walton, Lavon Hooks, and Roy Philon for a backup defensive end position. Alualu was named the backup right defensive end to Cameron Heyward to start the regular season.

Alualu made his Pittsburgh Steelers debut in their season-opening 21-18 victory over the Cleveland Browns and recorded five combined tackles. On September 17, 2017, he earned his first start of the season in place of Stephon Tuitt, who suffered a biceps injury the week prior. He collected three combined tackles during the Steelers' 26-9 victory over the Minnesota Vikings. In Week 7, he recorded four solo tackles and made his first sack as a Steeler, taking down Cincinnati Bengals' quarterback Andy Dalton in a 29-14 victory.

2018
In 2018, Alualu played in 15 games with two starts, recording a career-low 22 combined tackles and no sacks.

2019

On February 22, 2019, Alualu signed a two-year contract extension with the Steelers.
In week 4 against the Cincinnati Bengals, Alualu sacked Andy Dalton on a fourth down late in the fourth quarter, sealing a 27-3 win.

2020
In Week 2 against the Denver Broncos, Alualu recorded his first sack of the season on Jeff Driskel during the 26–21 win.

2021
During free agency, Alualu had initially agreed to terms with the Jacksonville Jaguars; however, his trip to Jacksonville was delayed due to his testing positive for COVID-19. He ultimately changed his mind and decided to instead re-sign with the Steelers on a two-year contract.

In Week 2, Alualu suffered a fractured ankle and was placed on injured reserve on September 20, 2021.

NFL career statistics

Personal life
Alualu was born in Honolulu, Hawaii, and grew up in the Kuhio Park Terrace neighbourhood of Kalihi. He was one of nine children, with seven sisters and a brother. His father, Ta'avao Alualu, went in and out of prison in Alualu's youth, having been convicted multiple times on assault and drug charges.

Alualu married Desiré Pomele in 2005. He had started at California in the summer of that year, but returned home before fall semester classes to get married and to see the birth of his first child, Tyreé. He returned to California and enrolled in January 2006. Alualu also has a daughter, Deréon, who was born in 2008. He now has 6 children total with the addition of Tydes in 2011, Tyten in 2015, Tyson-Jaxx in 2017, & Deonne-Skye in 2020.

References

External links
 Pittsburgh Steelers bio
California Golden Bears bio

1987 births
Living people
American sportspeople of Samoan descent
American football defensive ends
American football defensive tackles
California Golden Bears football players
Jacksonville Jaguars players
Pittsburgh Steelers players
Players of American football from Honolulu
Ed Block Courage Award recipients